Pedal laceration is a type of fragmentation (asexual reproduction) exhibited in sea anemones.

References

Asexual reproduction in animals
Actiniaria